Albert Ivanovich Valtin (November 17, 1937 – February 18, 2015) was a Soviet basketball player who competed in the 1960 Summer Olympics and won a silver medal.

References

1937 births
2015 deaths
Sportspeople from Kharkiv
Ukrainian men's basketball players
Soviet men's basketball players
Olympic basketball players of the Soviet Union
Basketball players at the 1960 Summer Olympics
Olympic silver medalists for the Soviet Union
Olympic medalists in basketball
Medalists at the 1960 Summer Olympics